The troika is a term used to refer to the single decision group created by three entities, the European Commission (EC), the European Central Bank (ECB) and the International Monetary Fund (IMF). It was formed in the aftermath of the European debt crisis as an ad hoc authority with a mandate to manage the bailouts of Cyprus, Greece, Ireland and Portugal, in the aftermath of their prospective insolvency caused by the world financial crisis of 2007–2008.

Earlier, "troika" had been used as the designation of a triumvirate that represented the European Union in its foreign relations, in particular concerning its common foreign and security policy (CFSP), until the Treaty of Lisbon was ratified in 2009.

Background of the financial crisis bailout troika

Role of the Troika 

The term troika has been widely used in Greece, Cyprus, Ireland, Portugal, and Spain to refer to the consortium of the European Commission, the European Central Bank and the International Monetary Fund that provided a bailout to these states since 2010, and the financial measures and government policies that the troika institutions have demanded to be implemented in return by Greece and the other concerning nations. Slovenia barely avoided intervention by the troika in 2013, thanks to the loan of EUR 1.5 billion acquired at the PIMCO. These institutions owned a wide influence and improved their power through time. They implemented a strong austerity program for the adjustment of Greek fiscal measures. The political impact of the austerity imposed on countries of the EU periphery, which were confronted with important debt, led to "a predominant economic and social dislocation".

Economic adjustment programmes 

The origin of the European troika can be traced back to the Greek loan package in May 2010 and the EFSF. The work of the three members were distinct: the IMF co-financed the loans for Greece, the ECB focused its competences on the banking system and the Commission worked on economic reforms with the IMF. The troika solution brought controversy into the Euro crisis' solution following the Lisbon Treaty, where European institutions increased democratization among the institutional landscape of the European Union. At this time, the EU was more technocratic and emphasised the domination's feeling of the Troika mechanism. During the crisis period, Germany played also a predominant role and took power to rebalance its national interests and the European interests. The European strategy was implemented with the aim to reduce the Greek fiscal deficit from 15% to 5%. In 2015, the GDP of Greece remained stagnant compared to 2009, and the loans appeared as not sufficient to attempt the fiscal aims fixed by the troika; 90% of the amount paid interest.
For Cyprus, Greece (thrice), Ireland and Portugal, the European Commission, the ECB and the IMF agreed Memoranda of Understanding with the relevant governments in a three-year financial aid programme on the condition of far-reaching austerity measures to be imposed on their societies in order to cut government expenditure.

For details in each case, see

 Economic Adjustment Programme for Cyprus
 First Economic Adjustment Programme for Greece
 Second Economic Adjustment Programme for Greece
 Economic Adjustment Programme for Ireland
 Economic Adjustment Programme for Portugal

Evolution 
The support of social benefits and wages was unable to deal with the crisis. With a decreasing social situation and a weak domestic production, the Greek debt grew and overtook the GDP rate. For the creditor countries, one of the most important aspects and efficient condition for the bailout was the liberalisation of product and the labour market in Greece. Although the plans affected to create a stronger economy in Greece leading to a certain performance, they were not efficient in short run. This case showed that these reforms taken in a context of fiscal austerity could lead to negative effect and did not provide improvement in a short time.

Institutions involved 

The term ‘troika’ has its origins in the Russian word for a three-horse carriage, but it is also used to describe an informal alliance between three actors. In the context of the Euro crisis, the term ‘Troika’ refers to the cooperation between three actors: the European Commission, the European Central Bank (ECB) and the International Monetary Fund (IMF).

The Troika set out the conditions under which financial assistance, or promises of assistance, would be approved to European countries in financial difficulties. When the three organisations offered assistance, the necessary measures and reforms were imposed in the form of a Memorandum of Understanding between the Troika and the Member States concerned.

The legal basis for the action taken by the Commission and the ECB can be considered debatable. The creation of this mechanism was due to a political and legal gap in the Treaty of Maastricht. Article 125 TFEU together with article 123 TFEU prevents countries of the eurozone with financial problems from being supported by other stakeholders, like the European Central Bank, European Union institutions or other eurozone countries, within the Monetary Union. Therefore, the competences of the Troika originated in a statement taken by the Heads of State and Government of the EU member states to establish a joint programme and to provide conditional bilateral loans to Greece. The Troika falls outside the scope of European law.

The Troika can be considered as a working group in charge of negotiating financial assistance programmes with indebted eurozone countries. Apart from that, it also carries out evaluations of the implementation level of the programme. The financial assistance in itself is provided by special mechanisms, such as the European Financial Stability Facility (EFSF), the European Financial Stabilisation Mechanism (EFSM) and the European Stability Mechanism (ESM). These financial programmes are concluded outside the European Treaties, and thus outside of the jurisdiction of EU law. However, all EU institutions should act in accordance with the Rule of Law, even when exercising outside of the Treaties.

International Monetary Fund 

The role of the International Monetary Fund (IMF) as a member of the Troika was not considered evident at the time. Firstly, this organisation is an 'outsider'; it is not an institution of the European Union. A second objection was that relying on the IMF's help was an admission of failure of the eurozone, and a dent in confidence in the euro. In the months leading up to the euro crisis, the IMF already had concerns that countries in the European periphery would be a potential threat to the other major financial markets in Europe via their commercial banks’ balance sheet exposures. When the first effects of the crisis emerged in Greece, the IMF was kept at a distance. The EU saw this as an internal matter and wanted to resolve it internally. After all, the IMF was pulled in anyway. It was seen as a reliable, neutral organisation that had enormous expertise in helping highly indebted countries. The IMF was responsible, together with the Finance ministers, for the decision making in the financial programmes.

European Commission 

The role of the European Commission within the European Troika is to participate in the Troika negotiations and the periodical supervising exercises on behalf of the eurozone Member States that provided the loans to the Eurozone countries in financial need. This function raises some concerns with the ‘independent’ function of the European Commission within the EU’s political framework. According to article 17 of the TEU “the Commission has to act completely independent in carrying out its responsibilities, and they shall refrain from any action incompatible with their duties or the performance of their tasks.”

The fact that the Commission is acting on behalf of the member states in case of financial assistance programs is far removed from its political role. The question remains as to how the Commission can reconcile its task within the EU and within the Troika. By acting on behalf of some Member States, the Commission is departing from its independent position.

European Central Bank 

Formally the European Central Bank (ECB) does not participate in the decision-making of the programme, these decisions are taken by the IMF and the Finance ministers of the Member States. The role of the ECB can be divided into three groups: A first aspect is the role of verbal interventions addressed to distressed Member States and financial markets. Its second role is the one where the ECB changes collateral policy and large-scale medium-term liquidity creation to encourage markets to invest in higher-yielding government bonds. Its third and most controversial role is the one where the ECB launches the Securities Market Programme, a kind of shaping programme that targets fiscal adjustment and structural reforms in the fiscal policy of individual member states. The ECB also provides advice and expertise on a broad range of issues relevant to the monetary policy and the financial stability of the eurozone countries.

Critics of the Troika 
 

The consequences of the decisions taken by the European Troika resulted in many critics both within the European institutions and at national levels. The European Parliament was excluded from negotiations  and therefore decided to establish a special committee of inquiry led by the Austrian centre-right MEP Othmar Karas in order to analyse the level of the Troika's accountability. According to the findings of the committee, the Troika's members had totally asymmetric distribution of responsibilities. In addition, differing mandates together with varying negotiation and decision-making structures only led to more divisions and made it difficult to find a common approach. As said the British MEP Sharon Bowles, the response to the crisis lacked transparency and necessary credibility. In fact, the Troika did not have any legal basis at all because it was established as an emergency solution. However, a German politician Norbert Lammert stated that in his view it was incorrect to discuss the lack of democratic legitimacy of the Troika since the adjustment programmes had been approved by the parliaments of Ireland, Portugal, Cyprus and Greece. But when the parliaments approved those programmes, they did not know what implications it might bring.

The Troika interventions generated long-lasting political damage not only for the European Union but also for its member states themselves. Many European citizens claimed that the budget cuts resulted in the eurozone's longest recession since the creation of the single currency back in 1999. During that period, the efficiency of the Troika was another cause of concern but the ECB president Jean-Claude Trichet tried to reassure people and highlighted the fact that "if nothing had been done for Greece, the impact of the crisis would have been undeniably worse for this country". As it turned out, the Troika underestimated the impact of austerity policies on economic growth.

Another problem was in the different philosophies in relation to economic policy across the EC, the ECB and the IMF according to the European Commissioner in charge of economic and monetary affairs Olli Rehn. Whereas the IMF advocated for more robust debt relief, the EU insisted on more limited option. The European institutions prioritised the maintenance of the cohesion and protection of own rules. Apart from that, the members of Troika could not agree upon potential risk of financial spillovers across member states of the eurozone. For the European institutions this was a very sensitive topic this is why the objective was to avoid debt restructuring. If only the Troika paid more attention to cross-country spillovers and deteriorating conditions, the consequences could have been less harmful.

The academic community criticised the Troika just as other stakeholders accusing it of having an immense power  and pursuing a fiscal conservatism approach. Based on the case studies, scholars as Kevin Featherstone and Judith Clifton together with Daniel Diaz-Fuentes and Ana Lara Gómez came to the conclusion that austerity policies in Greece were more brutal rather than in Ireland putting an emphasis again on the political and socio-economic consequences as administrative reforms, unemployment, emigration, serious deterioration of citizens' physical and mental health. Another prominent critics of the Troika are Yanis Varoufakis, a former Greek finance minister, and a German writer Fritz R. Glunk together with an American academic Noam Chomsky.

Earlier troika (Common foreign and security policy) 

This term was used in the European Union when referring to a triumvirate composed of the Foreign Affairs Minister of the Member State holding the (rotating) Presidency of the Council of Ministers, the Secretary-General of the Council of the European Union (who also held the post of High Representative of the Common Foreign and Security Policy), and the European Commissioner for External Relations. The "Troïka" represented the European Union in external relations that fell within the scope of the common foreign and security policy (CFSP).

With the 2009 ratification of the Lisbon Treaty, the post of Secretary-General of the Council was separated from the post of High Representative for the CFSP, which then assumed the responsibilities of the European Commissioner for External Relations. Since only two of the original posts making up the troika still exist, the definition of a triumvirate is no longer met.

See also 

 European debt crisis
 2012–13 Cypriot financial crisis
 Greek government-debt crisis
 Post-2008 Irish banking crisis
 2010–14 Portuguese financial crisis

References 

Political terminology
Russian words and phrases